The Maguindanao massacre, also known as the Ampatuan massacre, named after the town where mass graves of victims were found, occurred on the morning of November 23, 2009, in the town of Ampatuan in then-undivided Maguindanao (which is now Maguindanao del Sur) province, on the island of Mindanao in the Philippines. The 58 victims were on their way to file a certificate of candidacy for Esmael Mangudadatu, vice mayor of Buluan, when they were kidnapped and later killed. Mangudadatu was challenging Datu Unsay mayor Andal Ampatuan Jr., son of the incumbent Maguindanao governor Andal Ampatuan Sr. and member of one of Mindanao's leading Muslim political clans, in the forthcoming Maguindanao gubernatorial election, part of the national elections in 2010. The people killed included Mangudadatu's wife, his two sisters, journalists, lawyers, aides, and motorists who were witnesses or were mistakenly identified as part of the convoy.

The Committee to Protect Journalists (CPJ) has called the Maguindanao massacre the single deadliest event for journalists in history. At least 34 journalists are known to have died in the massacre. Even before the Maguindanao massacre, the Committee to Protect Journalists had labeled the Philippines the second most dangerous country for journalists, second only to Iraq.

Background

The Ampatuans had been in control of Maguindanao since 2001. Andal Ampatuan Sr. first came into prominence when President Corazon Aquino appointed him as Chief-of-Offices of Maganoy (now Shariff Aguak) in 1986 immediately after the People Power Revolution. Aquino, after coming into power in 1986 through a revolution, replaced every locally elected official with officers-in-charge, although the town of Maganoy was approached differently; the aging mayor, Pinagayaw Ampatuan, was replaced by his vice mayor, Andal Ampatuan Sr. He won the 1988 local elections and served for ten years. Andal Sr. was elected governor 1998.

Members of Lakas-Kampi-CMD, President Gloria Macapagal Arroyo listed Andal Sr. as a major ally in Mindanao. Autonomous Region in Muslim Mindanao (ARMM) regional governor Zaldy Ampatuan was the party's regional chairman. Andal Sr., the family patriarch, had been provincial governor since 1998; he had been elected three times, unopposed. Eighteen of the mayors in Maguindanao belong to the clan. The elder Ampatuan attributed his popularity to "popular support", adding that "Because I am so loved by the constituencies of the municipalities, they ask me to have my sons as representatives." In the 2004 presidential election, Arroyo won 69% of Maguindanao's vote; three years later, the party-backed coalition scored a 12–0 sweep of the senatorial elections in the province. Unable to run for a third term, he groomed his son, Andal Jr., to succeed him as governor.

With escalating tensions in the province, Arroyo, as head of Lakas-Kampi-CMD, mediated between the Ampatuans and the Mangudadatus (both are from the same party) to prevent election-related violence. Three meetings were held in mid-2009, with one meeting hosted by then-Secretary of National Defense and 2009–2010 party chairman Gilberto Teodoro, who ran to succeed Arroyo as president but was defeated by Noynoy Aquino. Arroyo's adviser for political affairs, Gabriel Claudio, disclosed that there was an initial agreement "in principle" that no Mangudadatu would contest Ampatuan Sr.'s governorship.

Attack 

Buluan Vice Mayor Esmael "Toto" Mangudadatu invited 37 journalists to cover the scheduled filing of his certificate of candidacy (COC) at the Commission on Elections (COMELEC) provincial office in Shariff Aguak. He said reports had reached him that his rivals had threatened to chop him into pieces once he filed his COC, and felt the presence of journalists would deter such an attack. On the week he was to file his certificate of candidacy (COC), he requested for security which the PNP Regional Command in the Autonomous Region in Muslim Mindanao rejected.

Mangudadatu changed plans. He would not go to Shariff Aquak personally. He would send an all-women party led by his wife, two sisters and an aunt with female lawyers. He was relying on an Islamic tradition that women are not to be harmed. For security, he would have media persons from South Cotabato and General Santos join the women convoy and cover the filing of his COC – believing the women were doubly safe under the eyes of media. Hours before the convoy departed, the media people must have been apprehensive. Zonio texted the 6th Infantry Division and was assured the road was safe.

A local report stated that at about 5:00 PM, a convoy of six vehicles carrying journalists, lawyers, and relatives of Vice Mayor Mangudadatu left Buluan to file his COC at the COMELEC office in Shariff Aguak. The convoy was composed of six vehicles: four Toyota Grandia vans (one grey, one green, and two white) owned by the Mangudadatu family; and two media vehicles – a Mitsubishi Pajero owned by DZRH broadcast journalist Henry Araneta, and a Mitsubishi L-300 van owned by UNTV. There was a seventh vehicle, a Grandia boarded by mediamen, but it lagged behind and decided to turn around once the passengers sensed what was happening. There were two other vehicles that were not part of the convoy but happened to be traveling on the same highway: a red Toyota Vios and a light blue Toyota Tamaraw FX. The Vios had five passengers: Eduardo Lechonsito, a government employee who was bound for a hospital in Cotabato City after suffering a mild stroke Monday morning; Lechonsito's wife Cecille; co-workers Mercy Palabrica and Daryll delos Reyes; and the driver Wilhelm Palabrica. The FX was driven by Anthony Ridao, employee of the National Statistics Coordination Board, and son of Cotabato City councilor Marino Ridao.

Before reaching its destination (about 10 km from Shariff Aguak, four on other versions), the convoy was stopped by 100 armed men, who abducted and later killed most or all of its members. There is evidence that at least five of the female victims, four of them journalists, were raped before being killed, while "practically all" of the women had been shot in their genitals. Mangudadatu's youngest sister and aunt were both pregnant at the time of their murders.

In a text message sent by Mangudadatu's wife to him, she identified the people that blocked their way as the men of Ampatuan Jr., and that he himself slapped her.
	
A backhoe located in the immediate vicinity of the carnage at Ampatuan town was identified as the instrument that was used to dig the graves of the victims two days beforehand, and then to bury them, including the vehicles. The perpetrators were not able to complete the job when a helicopter was spotted in the area. The backhoe, emblazoned with the name of Maguindanao Gov. Andal Ampatuan Sr., was later identified to belong to the Maguindanao provincial government.

According to the authorities, the attack killed 58 people, including 32 journalists. However, the body of 58th victim was never found. Reporters Without Borders announced that at least 12 of the victims were journalists, making this the deadliest such incident in the history of news media. The National Union of Journalists in the Philippines originally estimated that a total of 20 journalists were killed, including an undisclosed number of NUJP members. The Philippine Daily Inquirer later updated the number of journalists killed to 34.

On November 24, the president of the Philippines Gloria Macapagal Arroyo responded to the news of the massacre by declaring a state of emergency in Maguindanao, Sultan Kudarat and Cotabato City. Speaker of the House Prospero Nograles called on the police to quickly identify the perpetrators of the massacre and disarm private armies. The Philippine Department of Justice created a panel of special prosecutors to handle cases arising from the massacre.

Aftermath 
Nueva Ecija Rep. Eduardo Nonato N. Joson said the massacre might affect, or even lead to the cancellation of, the scheduled 2010 presidential elections. Candidates in the election condemned the massacre.

On Wednesday, November 25, 2009, the executive committee of the Lakas-Kampi-CMD political party unanimously voted to expel three members of the Ampatuan family – Maguindanao Gov. Datu Andal Ampatuan Sr. and his two sons, Gov. Datu Zaldy Ampatuan of the Autonomous Region in Muslim Mindanao (ARMM) and Mayor Andal Ampatuan Jr. – from the party for their alleged role in the Maguindanao massacre. An emergency meeting of the Lakas-Kampi-CMD was held in Pasig, during which the Ampatuans were stripped of their membership.

On Thursday, November 26, 2009, Ampatuan Jr. surrendered to his brother Zaldy, was delivered to adviser to the peace process Jesus Dureza, then was flown to General Santos on his way to Manila, where he was taken to the National Bureau of Investigation (NBI) headquarters. Police in the Philippines charged Andal Ampatuan Jr. with murder. Ampatuan denied the charges, claiming that he was at the provincial capitol in Shariff Aguak when the massacre took place. He instead blamed the Moro Islamic Liberation Front (MILF), specifically Ombra Kato, as the mastermind, a charge the MILF dismissed as "absurd."

Declaration of martial law 
On December 4, 2009, through Proclamation No. 1959, President Gloria Macapagal Arroyo officially placed Maguindanao province under a state of martial law, thereby suspending the privilege of the writ of habeas corpus. Executive Secretary Eduardo Ermita said the step was taken in order to avert the escalation of "lawless" violence in the province and pave the way for the swift arrest of the suspects in the massacre. Following the declaration, authorities carried out a raid on a warehouse owned by Andal Ampatuan Jr. The raid resulted in the confiscation of more than 330,000 rounds of 5.56×45mm NATO ammunition, a Humvee, and an improvised armored vehicle. Twenty militiamen were arrested on the premises. Captain James Nicolas of Special Forces was able to retrieve more high powered firearms and ammo after the incident. In the same raid, the law enforcers also uncovered thousands of Voter's ID buried on the ground. The state of martial law in Maguindanao was lifted on December 13, 2009.

Media fundraising
UNTV-37 arranged a fund-raising concert at the Araneta Coliseum for the families of 32 members of the media who perished in the attack.

Police operations
Philippines Police and soldiers raided several of the Ampatuan family's houses and homes, in Maguindanao's capital, Shariff Aguak, and next to the provincial headquarters, a compound surrounded by concrete walls about two metres (six feet) high and contains the homes of a number of Ampatuan clan members. Two of the other homes targeted in the raids belonged to Akmad Ampatuan, Ampatuan Snr's brother who is the vice governor of Maguindanao, according to national police chief Jesus Verzosa. Philippines National Police seized several armored personnel carriers, over a thousand military weapons including machine guns, assault and sniper rifles, sub-machine guns, shotguns, pistols, mortar launchers and rounds, grenades, rocket launchers, and caches of ammo and several military uniforms in one house, several buried weapons, ammo and COMELEC IDs in a vacant lot, rifles, shotguns, pistols, machine guns, SMGs and ammo, explosives and military uniforms in Zaldy's house. Andal's house had more weapons and ammo with military uniforms inside. The raids yielded weapons powerful enough to arm a battalion of soldiers, and ammo crates bears the name of DND in the side, criticism further inflamed the discovery. These situations were facilitated by Philippine law, which permits local government officials to legally buy an unlimited number of weapons without any obligation to report the type or number purchased, in effect allowing these 'warlords' to literally 'own the people' of the area, and these situations facilitate the clandestine arming of militant groups with machines of war and military-grade weaponry from anonymous government backing.

Legal proceedings

At least 198 suspects, including Andal Ampatuan Jr. and Andal Ampatuan Sr. and several other members of the Ampatuan clan, were charged with murder. In April 2010, the government dropped murder charges against Zaldy Ampatuan and Akhmad Ampatuan, who had presented alibis. This led to protests by family members of the victims.

Over a decade later, more than 80 of 197 suspects remained at large, including 12 Ampatuans, raising concerns over the safety of witnesses and relatives of the victims.

Senator Joker Arroyo remarked that with nearly 200 defendants and 300 witnesses, the trial could take 200 years. Prosecution lawyer Harry Roque computed that it would last more than 100 years. In a statement commemorating the massacre, the Center for Media Freedom and Responsibility remarked that the trial was "ongoing, but is rather moving slowly."

Andal Ampatuan Sr. was arraigned in a special court inside a Manila maximum-security prison on June 1, 2011, 18 months after he and a dozen family members were arrested over the killings. After a court clerk read the names of the 57 victims, he entered a plea of not guilty.

, two years after the massacre, only Andal Sr. and his son Andal Jr. had been charged, and some 100 of the 197 persons listed on the charge sheet were still unaccounted for.

On June 28, 2012, the Court of Appeals dismissed the petition of Anwar Ampatuan to have the murder charges against him quashed. Anwar Ampatuan is the grandson of former Maguindanao governor Andal Ampatuan Sr., and is charged with 57 counts of murder. He was arrested in August 2012. In September 2012, the Quezon City Regional Trial Court deferred his arraignment pending resolution of a pending motion to determine if there is probable cause to prosecute him for the charged 57 counts of murder.

In November 2012, acting on a motion filed by Andal Ampatuan Jr., the Supreme Court set guidelines disallowing the live media broadcast of the trial but allowing the filming of the proceedings for real-time transmissions to specified viewing areas and for documentation. This ruling was in reconsideration of an earlier ruling which had allowed live media coverage.

On March 4, 2014, the prosecution rested its case against Datu Andal "Unsay" Ampatuan Jr and 27 other suspects. The prosecutors said at that time that they were not ready to rest their case against 76 other accused due to pending appeals.

In August 2014, private prosecutors alleged that state prosecutors were compromising the case in exchange for bribes, saying that some of the state prosecutors were receiving bribes as large as PHP300 million. The Department of Justice issued an official statement where Supervising Undersecretary Francisco Baraan III and the Department of Justice Panel of Prosecutors denied having received any bribes. The statement also expressed that Baraan and the panel of prosecutors had the full trust and support of Justice Secretary Leila De Lima.

Also in August 2014, several teams of defense lawyers representing the accused withdrew from the case, citing conflicts of interest among their clients and other reasons. On August 13, the court assigned a public lawyer to represent accused affected by the withdrawals, including Andal Ampatuan Sr. and his son Andal Jr.

Datu Sajid Islam Ampatuan was granted bail in January 2015 as the prosecution failed to present strong evidence warranting his detention during trial. In September, the court denied the bail petition of Ampatuan Sr's other son and one of the main accused, former Autonomous Region in Muslim Mindanao (ARMM) governor Zaldy Ampatuan. The death of Andal Ampatuan Sr. on July 17, 2015, due to complications brought about by liver cancer, removed him from the legal proceedings. The Department of Justice started the probe of 50 new suspects with a preliminary investigation in March 2015.

In a landmark ruling reported on July 6, 2017, the special court handling the trial dismissed for lack of evidence the multiple murder case filed against three suspects: Kominie Inggo, Dexson Saptula and Abas Anongan. On November 22, 2017, the Public Information Office of the Supreme Court said in a briefing that around a third of the 103 accused who remain on trial had finished presenting their evidence and that, under the guidelines issued by the Supreme Court specifically applying to this case only, the court may render judgment separately and not wait for all the accused to conclude presenting their evidence. On June 21, 2018, Philippine Justice Secretary Menardo Guevarra said that he expected the case to be concluded in 2018. In a later statement on November 21, he said that he was hopeful of a decision within the first half of 2019. On August 8, 2019, Justice Secretary Menardo Guevarra said that the case may be decided before its 10th anniversary on November 23.

Verdict 
On December 19, 2019, Quezon City Regional Trial Court (RTC) Branch 221 Judge Jocelyn Solis Reyes served her judgment on the case at a special court session held at Camp Bagong Diwa in Taguig. In her verdict, the Ampatuan brothers—namely Datu Andal Ampatuan Jr. and Zaldy Ampatuan—were convicted of 57 counts of murder and sentenced to reclusion perpetua without parole. 28 co-accused (including police officers) were also convicted of 57 counts of murder and sentenced to 40 years; an additional 15 were sentenced to 6–10 years for being accessories to the crime. 55 others, including Datu Sajid Islam Ampatuan, brother of Zaldy and Andal Jr. and the mayor of Shariff Saydona Mustapha, Maguindanao, were acquitted.

Victims

Mangudadatu family and associates

Journalists 
Thirty-four journalists are known to have been abducted and killed in the massacre, according to the Philippine Daily Inquirer , only 25 had been positively identified.

Other civilian casualties 
Red Toyota Vios
Number of casualties: 5. They were supposedly mistaken as part of the convoy.

Blue Toyota FX
Number of casualties: 1. Mistaken as part of the convoy.

Human Rights Watch report
On November 16, 2010, the international non-governmental organization Human Rights Watch issued a 96-page report titled "They Own the People", charting the Ampatuans’ rise to power, including their use of violence to expand their control and eliminate threats to the family's rule. The report links the Ampatuans to at least 56 other killings over the last 20 years, apart from the November 23, 2009, massacre.

In popular culture

History Asia premiered a documentary on the Maguindanao massacre entitled The Maguindanao Massacre on September 26, 2010.

Filipino-American rap artist Bambu's 2012 album, ...one rifle per family., features a song titled Massacre detailing the massacre from the point of view of a journalist who witnessed the rape, mutilation, and murder of his family.

In July 2014, in memory of the five-year anniversary of the massacre, Sacramento-based author Victoria Conlu released a novel titled Portraits of a Massacre, a fictionalized retelling set in a province similar to Maguindanao. Reviews have called the book "a stirringly severe literary intervention".

The 2017 painting The Modern Holocaust (The Maguindanao Massacre) by the Filipino artist Romulo Galicano commemorates the massacre victims. It became a finalist in the 2017–2018 Art Renewal Center Salon competition.

The 2021 crime thriller On the Job: The Missing 8 (also known as On the Job 2 is partly inspired by the case. In the film, 8 people, mostly journalists, were ambushed, killed and was believed to be buried under the orders of their town's mayor, by an inmate who is routinely released from prison to carry out assassinations. The director Erik Matti said to New Musical Express (NME) that the film's themes were about tackling corruption in the Philippine media and would deliver a social commentary on the current state of the Philippine government.

Sexual assaults 

Lara Tan reporting for CNN Philippines on December 20, 2019, reported that three of the deceased female victims of the extrajudicial killings on the November 23, 2009 massacre Rahima Palawan, Leah Dalmacio, and Cecil Lechonsito, who were all devout and peaceful adherents of the Muslim faith, believing that women should not be raped or murdered while exercising the right to free speech. When they were registering Maguindanao's gubernatorial candidacy the three women were mutilated and sexually assaulted, before being executed by clandestine extrajudicial assassins, the court found.

761-page decision of Quezon City Regional Trial Court Branch 221 Judge Jocelyn Solis-Reyes on the Maguindanao massacre case, she cited the findings of Dr. Dean Cabrera, a medico-legal officer from the Philippines National Police Crime Laboratory who conducted forensic science examinations on the women victims.

See also 
 Extrajudicial killings and forced disappearances in the Philippines
 International Day to End Impunity
 List of journalists killed under the Arroyo administration
 List of massacres in the Philippines
 2015 Mamasapano clash

Notes

References

Further reading 
 
  (readable online here)
 Journeyman Pictures: "Turning a Blind Eye" 2010
 Behind the Philippines' Maguindanao Massacre, November 27, 2009, TIME magazine.

External links 
 
  (2007–present)

2009 in the Philippines
November 2009 events in the Philippines
November 2009 crimes
Assassinated Filipino journalists
Massacres in 2009
Massacres in the Philippines
Political repression in the Philippines
History of Maguindanao del Sur
2010 Philippine general election
Presidency of Gloria Macapagal Arroyo